In mathematics, the Borel fixed-point theorem is a fixed-point theorem in algebraic geometry generalizing the Lie–Kolchin theorem.

Statement
If G is a connected, solvable, linear algebraic group acting regularly on a non-empty, complete algebraic variety V over an algebraically closed field k, then there is a G fixed-point of V.

A more general version of the theorem holds over a field k that is not necessarily algebraically closed. A solvable algebraic group G is split over k or k-split if G admits a composition series whose composition factors are isomorphic (over k) to the additive group  or the multiplicative group . If G is a connected, k-split solvable algebraic group acting regularly on a complete variety V having a k-rational point, then there is a G fixed-point of V.

References

External links
 

Fixed-point theorems
Group actions (mathematics)
Theorems in algebraic geometry